Tomasz Piątek (born 1974) is a Polish journalist and writer. He is the author of several books, both fiction and non-fiction. For his reporting on the Polish Ministry of Defense he received the  2017 Press Freedom Award in 2017 from Reporters Without Borders.

References

1974 births
Polish journalists
Polish writers
Living people